Qyzylqayyng (Qyzylqaiyñ), before 1992 Saratovskoye or Saratovka, is a populated place in Almaty Region, Kazakhstan.

References

Populated places in Almaty Region